Dilip Dutta (born 29 September 1949) is an Indian former cricketer. He played one first-class match for Bengal in 1976/77.

See also
 List of Bengal cricketers

References

External links
 

1949 births
Living people
Indian cricketers
Bengal cricketers
Cricketers from Kolkata